USS Curb (ARS-21) was a Diver-class rescue and salvage ship commissioned by the U.S. Navy during World War II. Her task was to come to the aid of stricken vessels.

Curb (ARS-21) was launched 24 April 1943 by Basalt Rock Company in Napa, California; sponsored by Mrs. H. Peterson; and commissioned 12 May 1944.

World War II service 
 
Curb sailed from San Diego, California, 22 June 1944, delivered a battle raft to Eglin Field, Florida, and arrived at Norfolk, Virginia 26 July for war duty in the Atlantic Ocean. On 26 August she sailed for Argentia, Newfoundland, arriving 25 August for towing and salvage duties until she returned to Boston, Massachusetts, 16 November. She had similar duty at Bermuda from 27 November 1944 to 12 January 1945, serving the great number of ships training or assembling for convoys there.

Transfer to the Pacific Fleet 
 
After a brief overhaul at Norfolk, Curb sailed on towing duty to San Francisco, California, arriving 3 April. On 16 April 1945 she departed San Francisco to operate in Alaskan waters until putting into Seattle, Washington, 14 March 1946. On 9 August she arrived at San Pedro, California, for towing duty, voyaging twice to Bremerton, Washington, until 28 October when she cleared for Orange, Texas, arriving 23 November.

Post-war decommissioning 

Curb was decommissioned 20 December 1946 and loaned to a private salvage firm 10 May 1947 and was returned for lay up in the Reserve Fleet (date unknown). On 30 April 1981, she was struck from the Naval Register. Final Disposition: scrapped, 23 February 1982, her hulk sunk as an artificial reef off Key West, Florida, 23 November 1983.

The wreck lies at:

References

External links 
 
  Basalt Rock Company Shipbuilding History

 

Diver-class rescue and salvage ships
Ships built in Napa, California
World War II auxiliary ships of the United States
1943 ships
Ships sunk as artificial reefs
Maritime incidents in 1983